Daddy & Papa is a 2002 documentary film made by Johnny Symons. It explores same-sex parenting as seen in the lives of four families headed by male couples.  The film also examines the legal, social, and political challenges faced by gay parents and their children.

Filmmaker Symons and his partner William Rogers, along with their adopted son, Zachary, were one of the four families featured in the film.  Symons says of the project, I wanted to document this phenomenon: what it means for out gay men to form their own families - for the dads, for the kids, for their extended families and schools and communities and the thousands of mainstream people who are being changed by their exposure to a new kind of family.

Daddy & Papa was shown nationwide in the U.S. on PBS in the spring of 2003 as part of its Independent Lens series.  The film was scheduled for rebroadcast on the LOGO channel in August 2007.

Awards
The highly acclaimed documentary won numerous awards, including:
Emmy Award nomination, Best Documentary
Official selection, Sundance Film Festival
Golden Gate Award, Best First Person Documentary, San Francisco International Film Festival
Audience Award for Best Documentary, Florida Film Festival
Runner up for Best Film, Cleveland International Film Festival
Documentary Most Likely to Change the World, Detroit Docs Film Festival
Audience Award for Best Documentary, 1st Runner Up, Seattle International Film Festival
Breaking the Mold Award, Newport Film Festival
Best Documentary, Miami Gay and Lesbian Film Festival
Outstanding Documentary Nominee, GLAAD Media Awards
Honorary Mention, Best Feature Documentary, Oakland International Film Festival
Best Documentary, Dallas OUTTakes
Best Documentary, Connecticut Gay & Lesbian Film Festival
Best Documentary, University of Oregon Queer Film Festival
Audience Award for Best Documentary, Portland Lesbian & Gay Film Festival
Audience Award for Best Feature, Out at the Movies
Audience Award for Best Independent Documentary, ImageOut/Rochester Gay and Lesbian Film Festival
Audience Award for Best Film and Audience Award for Best Documentary, Orinda Film Festival
Silver Certificate of Merit, Prix Leonardo
Best Documentary, North Carolina Gay & Lesbian Film Festival
Official Selection, Input (International Public Television) Conference, Aarhus, Denmark
Special Mention, Icelandic Lesbian & Gay Film Festival

References

External links
Official Website
Full Film at Logo Online

Daddy & Papa Review from Film Threat
Daddy & Papa Review from Daily Variety

2002 films
American documentary films
Documentary films about gay men
2002 documentary films
LGBT parenting
2002 LGBT-related films
2000s English-language films
2000s American films